Ulisse Munari (born 1960) is an Italian astronomer and discoverer of minor planets. He is Professor of Astronomy at the University of Padua, and works at the Asiago Observatory. He is a member of the Radial Velocity Experiment (RAVE) team, an all-sky survey using the UK's 1.2m Schmidt telescope in Australia, as well as working with the planned GAIA mission.

Awards and honors 

The asteroid 7599 Munari is named after him. The official naming citation was published by the Minor Planet Center on 18 August 1997.

List of discovered minor planets 

Ulisse Munari discovered several asteroids, all in collaboration with Maura Tombelli and Flavio Castellani.

See also

References

External links 
 Homepage
 GAIA people, EAS.

21st-century Italian astronomers
Discoverers of asteroids

1960 births
Living people
20th-century Italian astronomers